The Women's long jump event  at the 2005 European Athletics Indoor Championships was held on March 4–5.

Medalists

(*) Bianca Kappler had originally won the competition with a jump measured as 6.96 metres. The measurement, however, was incorrect. Kappler pointed out the mistake and was awarded a bronze medal for fair play.

Results

Qualification
Qualifying perf. 6.63 (Q) or 8 best performers (q) advanced to the Final.

Final

(*) The jump was incorrectly measured as 6.96 m.

References
Results

Long jump at the European Athletics Indoor Championships
Long
2005 in women's athletics